Eggdrop is a popular IRC bot and the oldest that is still being maintained.

Development History 
It was originally written by Robey Pointer in December 1993 to help manage and protect the EFnet channel #gayteen; one Eggdrop bot version was named Valis.

Eggdrop was originally intended to help manage and protect channels from takeover attempts and other forms of IRC war.

Features 
The bot is written in the C programming language and features interfaces for C modules and Tcl scripts that allow users to further enhance the functionality of the bot.

A large number of Tcl scripts are available to expand the bot's functionality, most of them written by Eggdrop users.
Scripts are available to add and extend support for: online games, stats, user and channel management, information storage and lookup, greeting channel members, tracking last seen times, botnet management, anti-spam, file serving and distribution (usually via the DCC protocol), IRC services (similar to ChanServ and NickServ), and much more.

Eggdrop includes built-in support for sharing user information and channel bans. However, a script is required to simultaneously control multiple bots and for bots to coordinate channel management and modes.

The bot also features a "botnet", which allows multiple bots to be linked together to share data and act in a coordinated fashion. The botnet supports a "party line", which is accessible via DCC CHAT and Telnet. People can communicate within the botnet on various channels in an equivalent to a miniature IRC. Channel 0, the default, is referred to as the "party line".

Popularity 
Over the years Eggdrop has become one of the most popular bots run by IRC users.

See also 

 Internet Relay Chat
 Internet Relay Chat bot
 Comparison of Internet Relay Chat bots
 Shell account
 Tcl

References

External links
 
 Tcl/Tk tutorials YouTube playlist in an Android application for your Eggdrop Tcl Scripts
 
 
 
 The IRC bot uptime project
 Modern site to support Eggdrop and even provides Eggdrop hosting

Internet Relay Chat
Internet Relay Chat bots
Free software programmed in C
Free software programmed in Tcl
Cross-platform free software
Internet software for Linux
Unix Internet software
Windows Internet software
1993 software